Sphallambyx mexicanum is a species of beetle in the family Cerambycidae. It was described by Galileo and Martins in 2006. It is known from Mexico.

References

Cerambycini
Beetles described in 2006